A list of films produced by the Marathi language film industry based in Maharashtra in the year 1964.

1964 Releases
A list of Marathi films released in 1964.

References

Lists of 1964 films by country or language
 Marathi
1964